Colonel Mark Sever Bell,  (15 May 1843 – 26 June 1906) was an English recipient of the Victoria Cross, the highest award for gallantry in the face of the enemy that can be awarded to British and Commonwealth forces. Born in the Australian colony of New South Wales, his family travelled to England when he was an infant.

He was educated at King's College School and King's College London, where he was made a Fellow in 1890.

Bell was 30 years old, and a lieutenant in the Corps of Royal Engineers, British Army during the First Ashanti Expedition when the following deed took place on 4 February 1874 at the Battle of Ordashu, Ashanti (now Ghana) for which he was awarded the VC: 

He later achieved the rank of colonel. While serving as the commanding officer of Shornecliff military barracks at Folkestone Kent in 1890 a curious incident involving Colonel Bell occurred making national news. The colonel had been expecting 11 packages by mail wagon but the postman counted 12 addressed to the recipient. While driving his horse and cart up Sandgate hill, a pothole in the road jolted the vehicle and its contents which fell onto the street with the 12th package spilling open. It was revealed to be a stone pickle jar in which was found the dead body of a male infant whose chest had been mutilated and top of the skull removed. The colonel denied any knowledge of who the package had been sent by and policemen managed traced the sender of the package back to a fashionable West-End London address.  The property was owned by a wealthy young lady who claimed that the parcel may have been sent by her brother, a doctor and pathologist, who had died three years earlier and who supposedly kept human specimens. However, it appears that the young lady may have either perverted the law of justice or had been let off her crime due to her social status and class.

He died at Windlesham and his is buried at All Soul's Churchyard, South Ascot, Berkshire, England. A headstone marks his grave.

His Victoria Cross is displayed at the Royal Engineers Museum, Chatham, England.

References

"News." Evening Telegraph, 21 Mar. 1890, p. 3. British Library Newspapers, Accessed 27 Mar. 2019.

External links
 Royal Engineers Museum Sappers VCs
Location of grave and VC medal (Berkshire)

1843 births
1906 deaths
People educated at King's College School, London
Alumni of King's College London
Fellows of King's College London
British recipients of the Victoria Cross
Companions of the Order of the Bath
Royal Engineers officers
British military personnel of the Third Anglo-Ashanti War
People from Sydney
British military personnel of the Bhutan War
British Army recipients of the Victoria Cross
Australian emigrants to England
Recipients of the MacGregor Medal